Aguirre is a barrio in the municipality of Salinas, Puerto Rico. Its population in 2010 was 14,005.

History
Puerto Rico was ceded by Spain in the aftermath of the Spanish–American War under the terms of the Treaty of Paris of 1898 and became an unincorporated territory of the United States. In 1899, the United States Department of War conducted a census of Puerto Rico finding that the population of Aguirre barrio was 1,291.

Aguirre was once a municipality, until it was merged into Salinas during the 1990s. Before that, Aguirre was Puerto Rico's smallest municipality, a distinction now held by Cataño near San Juan.

The Central Aguirre Historic District was listed on the U.S. National Register of Historic Places in 2002.

For many years, Aguirre's main economical support came from the Central Azucarera de Aguirre, a local sugar factory. Currently, the barrio still has a "central" but this one is operated by the Autoridad de Energía Eléctrica de Puerto Rico, a government energy company. On Monday, July 25, 2016, there was a fire at the plant when  there was an unnoticed petroleum leak. No one was injured, but the central's plants were unworkable for the following three weeks.

The Central Azucarera de Aguirre was placed on the 2020 World Monuments Watch by the World Monuments Fund organization. The organization will use the site as a focal educational resource to train people in Puerto Rico on building with wood.

Transportation
Aguirre, like the rest of Salinas, is accessible by car and other wheeled vehicles through Puerto Rico Highway 1, which connects the country's two largest cities of San Juan and Ponce. The nearest commercial airport is Mercedita Airport in Ponce, while the nearest airport with multiple international flights is Luis Muñoz Marín International Airport in San Juan.

See also

 List of communities in Puerto Rico

References

Barrios of Salinas, Puerto Rico
1990s disestablishments in Puerto Rico
Former cities
Populated places disestablished in the 1990s